Simone Ashwini Pillai (born 30 March 1995), known professionally as Simone Ashley, is a British actress. She is known for her roles in the Netflix period drama Bridgerton (2022–present) and the comedy-drama Sex Education (2019–2021), also on Netflix.

Early life 
Born Simone Ashwini Pillai to Indian Tamil parents Latha and Gunasekharan Pillai, Ashley is from Camberley, Surrey and has an older brother. Ashley has spoken about how despite growing up in a household of academics, she was always drawn more towards the creative fields. Her parents were hesitant about her inclination to the arts. "My parents were quite protective over me," she told Glamour. "They're first generation. They came from India to this country, so they didn't really have a life where they could choose to be whatever they wanted." Ashley grew up singing classical music, opera, and playing the piano.

Ashley's family later moved to Beaconsfield, where she attended Beaconsfield High School and later Redroofs Theatre School in Maidenhead for sixth form. She spent some of her teen years in Ojai, California where she has relatives. She then went onto study acting at Arts Educational School in West London.

Career

Early work (2016–2021) 
Ashley's first acting role was in two episodes of the CBBC fantasy teen drama Wolfblood as Zuhra. This was followed by appearances in the thriller series Guilt (2016) and the ITV crime drama Broadchurch (2017). She made her feature film debut in 2018 with a small role in Boogie Man as Aarti, and a more prominent role in Kill Ben Lyk as one of the many characters named Ben Lyk.

From 2019 to 2021, Ashley played the recurring character Olivia Hanan in the Netflix comedy-drama Sex Education. She also appeared in the ITV psychological thriller miniseries The Sister as Elise Fox in 2020.

Breakthrough 
Ashley was named one of Variety'''s 2021 Brits to Watch. Having auditioned in 2020, it was announced in February 2021 that Ashley would star as leading lady Kate opposite Jonathan Bailey as Anthony in the second series of the Shondaland-produced Netflix romance period drama Bridgerton, based on the second novel in Julia Quinn's Bridgerton series,The Viscount Who Loved Me. The series was released in March 2022. She is set to reprise her role for the third series.

In 2022, Ashley featured in the Forbes 30 Under 30 list in European entertainment, the Time 100 Next, and The Hollywood Reporter's Great British and Irish Film and TV Breakouts. She will play Indira, a sister of Ariel in the 2023 live-action film adaptation of Disney's The Little Mermaid''.

Filmography

Film

Television

Music videos

Awards and nominations

References

External links

Living people
1995 births
21st-century English actresses
British actresses of Indian descent
Actresses from Buckinghamshire
Actresses from Surrey
English people of Indian Tamil descent
People educated at Redroofs Theatre School
People educated at the Arts Educational Schools
People from Beaconsfield
People from Camberley